The Chitimukulu is the King or Paramount Chief of the Bemba, the largest ethnic group in Zambia. All Chitimukulus, as well as lesser Bemba chiefs, are members of the Bena Ng'andu (English: Crocodile Clan). Potential successors to the ruling Chikimukulu are chosen from the various Bemba chiefs.

The king's title comes from the first recorded Chitimukulu, who was originally named Chiti Muluba, but changed his name to Chiti Mukulu. In the 18th century, he led the Bemba out from their original lands in the Luba Empire of Mukulumpe in DR Congo to eventually settle the country around Kasama in Zambia's Northern Province.

The original Bemba Kings are said to have been descendants of King Mukulumpe and his last wife Mumbi Mukasa who belonged to the Crocodile Clan. Together, they had four children: Katongo, Nkole, Chiti and Chilufya Mulenga. The Bemba were given a kingdom to rule by their father. According to legend, they then built a tower to help them see approaching enemies from a distance, but the tower collapsed, causing several deaths. The Bemba leaders were called by their father to exculpate themselves but in the end, their elder brother was arrested and blinded to send a message to his young brothers. After the Bemba Kings saw the cruelty of their father, they decided to leave and settle where they would find a dead crocodile. After years of wandering in Zambia the Bemba settled in Mungwi District, having found a dead crocodile. The first Chitimukulu to settle in Lubemba was Chilufya Mulenga.

Following the death of Chitimukulu Chilufya Mwango Chitapankwa III, Henry Kanyanta Sosola Chitimukulu was formally recognised and confirmed as the 38th King of the Bemba on the 25 January 2015. The current king of the Bemba Kingdom is King Kanyanta Manga II Henry Sosola.

Further reading

References

Literature 
 

History of Zambia
Zambian culture
Bemba
Titles of national or ethnic leadership